The Soure Marine Extractive Reserve is an extractive reserve in the state of Pará, Brazil.

Location

The Soure Marine Extractive Reserve is in the municipality of Soure, Pará, on Marajó island and is contained within the Marajó Archipelago Environmental Protection Area.
The riverine Manguezal do Rio do Saco section has an area of about  along the Saco River, a left (north) tributary of the Paracauari River.
The climate is equatorial Amazon.
There are three villages: Pesqueiro, Caju-Úna and Céu.

History

The Soure Marine Extractive Reserve was created by presidential decree on 23 November 2001.
The deliberative council was created on 26 November 2003.
In December 2005 a project to engage the traditional communities in support of ecotourism was approved by the reserve's board, with the support of the Spanish Agency for International Cooperation (AECI) and Secretariat of Sustainable Development of the Ministry of the Environment.
On 23 March 2010 responsibility for administering the reserve was transferred to the Chico Mendes Institute for Biodiversity Conservation (ICMBio).
In 2013 ICMBio taught about 140 students from public schools in the town of Soure about the mangroves and how to protect them, including classroom talks and field trips.

People and economy

There are 1,400 people in the reserve in twelve communities.
The main economic activity in nine communities is crab picking, with 278 people engaged in this work.
89.2% of the crab pickers are male and 51% are over 40 years old.
Most have little education, and 21% are illiterate.
During the off season they turn to shrimping or fishing.
About 55% of crabbers earn less than the minimum wage.
The families also gather or cultivate plants.
51% of families get water from community wells.
92.4% have inadequate sewage systems.
Almost all garbage is buried, burned or used as fertiliser.

The occupants of the reserve are only partially aware of the conservation rules.
Unlike fishers from the town of Soure, they do not engage in trawling with nets.
However, they do capture female crabs, and are not aware that this is illegal.
The main threat to their livelihood is predatory crabbing by professionals from outside the reserve.
Other issues are failure to receive aid payments, illegal extraction of sand from the beaches, solid waste on the beaches and changes to water quality.

Notes

Sources

2001 establishments in Brazil
Marine extractive reserves of Brazil
Protected areas of Pará
Protected areas established in 2001